John Griffiths (born 19 December 1956) is a Welsh Labour and Co-operative politician and the former Minister for Environment and Sustainable Development in the Senedd. Griffiths has represented the constituency of Newport East since the Senedd (then as the National Assembly for Wales) was established in 1999.

Education
Griffiths studied law as a mature student at the University of Wales.

Professional career
Before his election to the Senedd, he was a practising solicitor (criminal law, personal injury and general civil litigation).

Political career
He is a former councillor on Gwent County Council and Newport CBC. He is a member of Labour's National Policy Forum,  the Co-operative Party, Workers' Educational Association and Full Employment Forum. He is a committed republican, and a member of the ISTC trade union. Griffiths has been a member of the Senedd for Newport East since 1999. His political interests include economic development, social inclusion, education and Europe.

In the Senedd he was appointed Deputy Minister for Health and Social Care (Older People) from May 2003 until May 2007. In the Third Assembly was appointed Deputy Minister for Education, Culture and the Welsh Language (31 May 2007) and retained that position when the coalition government of Plaid Cymru and Labour was announced on 19 July. John supported Carwyn Jones in the Welsh Labour leadership contest in 2009, and went on to support Mark Drakeford in 2018. He was appointed Counsel General and Leader of the Legislative Programme in the Welsh Assembly in December 2009, a job previously done by First Minister Carwyn Jones.

External links
 
 John Griffiths AM Website
 National Assembly for Wales Website

References

1956 births
Living people
People from Newport, Wales
Councillors in Wales
Alumni of the University of Wales
Wales AMs 1999–2003
Wales AMs 2003–2007
Wales AMs 2007–2011
Wales AMs 2011–2016
Wales MSs 2016–2021
Wales MSs 2021–2026
Labour Co-operative members of the Senedd
Members of the Welsh Assembly Government
Politics of Newport, Wales
Welsh republicans